Kenneth William Walters (April 29, 1922 – February 13, 1992) was an American professional basketball player. He played in the National Basketball League for the Syracuse Nationals in one game during the 1947–48 season. His playing career spanned four total seasons, however, as he did compete in various other professional leagues of the time.

Walters moved to Clearwater, Florida where he coached Clearwater High School's basketball team and also sold insurance. He became the Clearwater City Commissioner in 1960.

References

1922 births
1992 deaths
American Basketball League (1925–1955) players
American men's basketball players
Basketball coaches from Ohio
Basketball players from Ohio
Guards (basketball)
Hartford Hurricanes players
High school basketball coaches in Florida
Ohio Bobcats men's basketball players
People from Athens County, Ohio
Professional Basketball League of America players
Sportspeople from Clearwater, Florida
Syracuse Nationals players